Alonzo Keith Mathis Jr. (born January 27, 1981), better known by his stage name Gorilla Zoe, is an American rapper originally from East Point, Georgia. He is best known for being a member of the rap group Boyz N Da Hood. His solo debut album Welcome to the Zoo came out in 2007. His next two albums, Don't Feed Da Animals and King Kong, were released in 2009 and 2011. In 2015, he released two mixtapes: Recovery and Raised in the Jungle. He has been an independent artist since 2018.

Career
In 2006, Mathis replaced Young Jeezy as a member of Boyz N Da Hood. He first saw success in collaborations with Yung Joc's "Coffee Shop" and "Bottle Poppin'," which charted on several Billboard charts. He was then signed as a solo artist for Block Entertainment and Bad Boy South.

On April 24, 2007, Gorilla Zoe released his first single, "Hood Figga", which was a success, peaking at #38 on the Billboard Hot 100. His debut solo album, Welcome to the Zoo, was released in October 2007, peaking at #18 on the Billboard 200, #8 on Top R&B/Hip-Hop Albums, and #3 on Top Rap Albums. In 2007, Gorilla Zoe was chosen for the 2008 XXL Freshmen cover along with rappers Saigon, Plies, Rich Boy, Joell Ortiz, Lupe Fiasco, Lil Boosie, Crooked I, Papoose, and Young Dro.

On October 7, 2008, "Lost", Gorilla Zoe's first single from his second album, was released. The full album, Don't Feed da Animals, was released on March 17, 2009, topping the Billboard Top Rap Albums chart. It sold 29,000 copies in its first week, peaking on the Billboard 200 at #8. A second single from the album, "What It Is", featuring Rick Ross and Kollosus, was later released, and a third single, "Echo", followed.

During February 2010, Gorilla Zoe released a mixtape every day on the mixtape website DatPiff.com. He released an EP, I Am Atlanta 3. He also worked on a mixtape with Die-Verse City member Qu1k.

On June 14, 2011, Gorilla Zoe released his third solo album, King Kong. Although not as successful as his previous albums, it charted on the Billboard 200 at #56, selling 10,300 copies in its first week out. Allmusic rated the album three-and-a-half stars out of five. A single from the album, "What's Goin' On", was released on December 14, 2010, and peaked at #99 at the Billboard Hot R&B/Hip-Hop Songs Chart.

On May 6, 2014, after a two-year hiatus, Gorilla Zoe released a new mixtape, Recovery, and it was revealed that he had signed to rapper Flo Rida's label International Music Group.

In July 2018, Gorilla Zoe released "Fat Jesus", his first single as an independent artist.

Discography

2007: Welcome to the Zoo
2009: Don't Feed da Animals
2011: King Kong
2017: Don't Feed da Animals 2
2017: Gorilla Warfare
2019: I Am Atlanta 4ever
2020: 31 DAYS OF COVID-19

References

External links

African-American male rappers
Bad Boy Records artists
Living people
Place of birth missing (living people)
Rappers from Atlanta
1982 births
21st-century American rappers
21st-century American male musicians
21st-century African-American musicians
20th-century African-American people